This is a list of the mayors of the Shire of Stawell, a former local government area in Victoria, Australia.

Mayors (Borough) (1870–1994)

Mayors (Northern Grampians) (1995–2011)

External links
 Present Shire: Northern Grampians

See also
City of Stawell
Shire of Stawell

References

Stawell
Mayors Stawell
Stawell, Victoria